Carey Jay Green (born March 31, 1956) is the current head coach of the Liberty University women's basketball team.  He has one of the highest winning percentages of NCAA active women's coaches at 74%.

High school: Friendsville High '74, Friendsville, Tennessee 
College: Coastal Carolina '79
Family: Wife, Denise; daughter, Angie; son, Brian

Head coaching record

References

External links
Green's bio at official Liberty athletics site

1956 births
Living people
American women's basketball coaches
Basketball coaches from Tennessee
Clemson Tigers women's basketball coaches
Coastal Carolina University alumni
High school basketball coaches in the United States
Liberty Lady Flames basketball coaches
Junior college women's basketball coaches in the United States